Studio One Presents Burning Spear is the debut studio album of the Jamaican musician Burning Spear, released in 1973.

Track listing

Side one
"Ethiopians Live It Out"
"We Are Free"
"Fire Down Below"
"Creation"
"Don't Mess With Jill"
"Down By The Riverside"

Side two
"Door Peep Shall Not Enter"
"Pick Up The Pieces"
"Get Ready"
"Journey"
"Them A Come"
"He Prayed"

Credits
All songs written by Winston Rodney
Recorded at Jamaica Recording and Publishing Studio
Music Arranged by Clement Dodd
Published by JAMREC Music/BMI

Musicians
The Sound Dimensions

References

Burning Spear albums
1973 debut albums